Ali Fathy Omar Ali (born 2 January 1992) is an Egyptian professional footballer in Egyptian Team side Zamalek SC. He plays for Egypt national football team and has also competed at the 2012 Summer Olympics.

References

1992 births
Living people
Egyptian footballers
Egypt youth international footballers
Egypt international footballers
Egyptian expatriates in Portugal
Expatriate footballers in Portugal
Primeira Liga players
C.D. Nacional players
Zamalek SC players
Olympic footballers of Egypt
Footballers at the 2012 Summer Olympics
Association football defenders
Egyptian Premier League players